Imus, officially the City of Imus, is a 3rd class component city and de jure capital of the province of Cavite, Philippines. According to the 2020 census, it has a population of 496,794 people.

However, most offices of the provincial government are still located in Trece Martires. Imus was officially converted into a city following a referendum on June 30, 2012.

Imus was the site of two major Katipunero victories during the Philippine Revolution against Spain. The Battle of Imus was fought on September 3, 1896, and the Battle of Alapan, on May 28, 1898, the day when the first Philippine flag was flown making Imus the "Flag Capital of the Philippines". Both events are celebrated annually in the city. The Imus Historical Museum honors the city's history with historical reenactment of scenes from the revolution.

Etymology

There are at least four versions on the origin of the name of the city.  Firstly, Imus is a Tagalog word meaning "a piece of land cutting into the junction of two rivers."  The old location of the church is in Toclong where the confluence of the Imus and Julian rivers is located, forming a slice of land.

A second version is a rationalization of a geographical fact.  Some intellectuals of the city theorized that the name "Imus" originated from the Latin word infimus, meaning lowland. Comparing the altitude of different towns in Cavite province, Imus is described as lowland, slowly elevating to the neighboring city of Dasmariñas, to Silang, Indang, Amadeo, Mendez, Alfonso, General Emilio Aguinaldo, peaking in Tagaytay Ridge, the highest part of the province, as upland towns.

Although there is no verifiable source of this theory, it has also been said that the name Imus is derived from the word centimos, the smallest unit of metal currency during the Spanish colonial era. During that era, a detachment of Spanish soldiers was stationed at the Recollect estate house, and after they left a few natives scrounged the place for articles left behind. They found a number of centimo coins and went away exclaiming in utter delight, "Centimos! Centimos!". The place has since been identified as Imus.

Still, another legend is that of a young mother crooning her child to sleep with a plaintive Tagalog ditty called "limos." A group of Spanish soldiers, who had gone there for the first time, asked her name of the place, and the woman, thinking that they were asking her the name of the song, answered "Limos". The Spaniards went away muttering the last syllable "imus".

History

Early history

Like Cavite City (originally called Cavite La Punta) and Noveleta (La Tierra Alta), Imus used to be a part of Cavite el Viejo (now Kawit), whose parish church was built by the Jesuits during the administration of Archdiocese of Manila Archbishop Miguel Garcia Serrano, 1618–1629. For more than a century and a half the people of Imus had to endure walking or traveling  of dirt road to attend religious services or transact official business in the city proper. The difficulty of communication between Imus and Cavite el Viejo was a long-standing complaint of the Imuseños until another religious order, the Augustinian Recollects, as a consequence of the British occupation of Manila in 1762, established a parish church in Imus, in what is now known as Bayang Luma.

However, the church site was far from the estate house of the  hacienda acquired in 1686 by the Recollect Corporation, and when the church was destroyed by the strong typhoon of September 1779, the Recollect Friars transferred it to barrio Toclong, and finally to sitio de Balangon, now the city plaza of Imus.

With the establishment of the Recollect parish the people of Imus gained their religious emancipation from the Jesuit-run parish of Cavite el Viejo. The Recollects, however, would not be content with little victory or achievement. In 1774, Recollect Fr. Pedro San Buenaventura petitioned the government to "separate the inquilinos (tenants) of Imus from the political jurisdiction of the government of "Cavite el Viejo". After a considerable time of waiting, the petition was granted and Imus became an independent municipality on October 3, 1795.

On May 28, 1898, Imus gained its independence from Spanish colonial rule after the last remaining stronghold of forces from the Spanish empire had been defeated in the Battle of Alapan as headed by General Emilio Aguinaldo. This battle led to the Philippine Declaration of Independence in Kawit, Cavite June 12, 1898. The modern flag of the Philippines was first unfurled in victory during this battle as they march their way to the present day Cavite City, together with the captured forces of Spain. In commemoration of the event, A Battle of Alapan marker was constructed inside the compound of Alapan Elementary School May 28, 1998, and was inaugurated by President Fidel V. Ramos. Although, May 28, 2014, a new marker and the Imus National Heritage Park were inaugurated at Barangay Alapan 2-A to make the initially constructed marker more accessible to the public.

Modern history
On June 11, 1977, then President Ferdinand Marcos issued Presidential Decree No. 1163, which transferred the provincial capital of Cavite from Trece Martires to Imus City. There is no other enabling law after that, that specifies the capital of Cavite

On May 28, 2008, National Flag Day, the city celebrated the First Wagayway Festival (Flag-Waving Festival) signifying the very first unfurling of the Flag of the Philippines during the Battle of Alapan on May 28, 1898, against the Spanish colonizers.  The battle was a major victory for General Emilio Aguinaldo (later the first president of the Philippine Republic) during the Philippine Revolution, which eventually led to the Philippine Declaration of Independence from Spain on June 12, 1898, in nearby Kawit, Cavite.  The five-day event was highlighted by the historical reenactment of events from the sewing of the flag by Filipino exiles in Hong Kong, the Battle of Alapan, to the defeat of the Filipinos by the American troops silencing the dreams of an independent Philippines.  The reenactment included students, city employees and barangay officials.

The festival was launched by then mayor, Emmanuel Maliksi, who reminded the people that the core of the celebration is love and respect for the Philippine flag, which symbolizes freedom and love for the country.  Among the guests present was the former Prime Minister of the Philippines, Cesar Virata, who is a grandnephew of General Emilio Aguinaldo.

Lone District of Imus
A bill was filed by Representative  Joseph Abaya with co-authors Congressman Pidi Barzaga and Crispin Remulla creating the municipality of Imus as a lone Legislative districts of the Philippines. The bill was supported by Senator Panfilo Lacson, Senator Richard Gordon and Senator Bong Revilla.  On October 22, 2009, Republic Act 9727 was approved by the President of the Philippines creating the lone District Imus as the "Third District of Cavite".

Cityhood

During the 10th Congress (1995–1998), a House Bill (HB) no. 08960 was filed by Congressman Renato P. Dragon together with the other cityhood bills for Bacoor (HB 08959) and Dasmariñas (HB 08931). The bills did not pass the Congress. Congressman Erineo Maliksi filed House Bill no. HB01989 last August 3, 2010, which created the city of Imus. The bill was enacted into law as Republic Act No. 10161. The plebiscite required to ratify the conversion of the municipality of Imus into a component city was scheduled June 30. 2012. Republic Act No. 10161 was ratified by the registered voters of Imus through a plebiscite conducted last June 30, 2012, converted the municipality of Imus in the Province of Cavite into a component city to be known as the City of Imus. There were about 22,742 voters who cast their ballots in the town's 453 polling precincts. The "yes" votes won overwhelmingly getting 20,438 while the "no" votes got 2,304.

Geography

Topography

With the continuous expansion of Metro Manila, this local government unit is now included in the Greater Manila area, which reaches Lipa City in its southernmost part.

Climate

Barangays
Imus City is subdivided into 97 barangays grouped into two local and national electoral districts officially called Imus West and Imus East, which are represented in the Congress by their respective representatives and city council by their respective councilors. In 1998, the town was composed of 21 barangays; these former barangays were further subdivided to make the current collection of 97. The barangays which have been divided into multiple pieces carry the original barangay name, distinguished by capital letters if the name ends in numbers; for example, Medicion 1 is subdivided into Medicion 1-A, Medicion 1-B, etc.  Names ending in letters (such as Bucandala, Bayan Luma, etc.) are distinguished by numbers (Bucandala 1, Bayan Luma 2, etc.). The only exceptions to this rule are Barangay Buhay na Tubig and the Barangays inside Bahayang Pag-asa Subdivision, namely Mariano Espeleta I to III, Pinagbuklod, Magdalo, Maharlika and Bahayang Pag-asa (later renamed Bagong Silang).

District I

District II

Demographics

Religion
The majority of the inhabitants of Imus are Christian, composed mostly of Catholics, Protestants, Members Church of God International, Aglipayans, and of other various sects. There is also sizable population of Muslims due to the influx of migrants from Mindanao.

Imus is the see of the Diocese of Imus, which is coterminous with the province. Imus Cathedral, which is under the patronage of the canonically-crowned Nuestra Señora del Pilar de Imus (Our Lady of the Pillar of Imus), is the seat of the Bishop of the Diocese of Imus. The city served as the host diocese during the 5th Asian Youth Day on November 20–27, 2009.

Economy

Imus is the foremost banking center of Cavite with numerous financial institutions and also an excellent banking infrastructure is being propagated by the present government to spearhead the development of the city. The city of Imus has shown a steady rise in its income earning a 1st class income classification in 1986. Its  land area serves as home to a population of 195,482. In 1993, Imus had 1,369 commercial establishments, 200 manufacturing establishments and 41 financial institutions. Ten years hence, it has 6,636 licensed business establishments that include 4,376 commercial establishments, 300 manufacturing establishments and 190 financial institutions.

With a comfortable  distance from Metro Manila, Imus serves as a favorable site for industrial establishments such as the  Imus Informal Industrial Estate and Anabu Hills Industrial Estate. Corporations that are 100% Filipino-owned include Annie's Candy Manufacturing, Inc., CKL Industries and Liwayway Mktg. Corp. Factories of partly Filipino-owned corporations include Champan Garment Corp., Hayag Motorworks & Machine Shop and San Miguel-Yamamura Asia Corp.. Foreign-owned corporations include Frontline Garments Corp. and EDS MFG, Inc., which produces automotive wiring harness. Imus is also the home of the Anabu Handmade Paper Products, a producer of handmade paper and paper products.

The Imus Commercial/Business District along Nueño Avenue (also called Imus Boulevard) is the center of commerce in the city. The Imus Public Market (Pamilihang Bayan ng Imus) is the hub of trade in the district. The market is divided into 25 zones and has 805 stalls. Commercial, industrial and manufacturing industries owned by Taiwanese, Japanese and Filipino investors can also be found there. There are 3,601 commercial establishments duly registered in the city as of March 1999.

Eighteen major industrial establishments with a total capitalization of 1.311 billion pesos have established their base at the Imus Informal Industrial Estate providing local employment to an estimated 13,478 people as of December 1998. Located just along the stretch of the General Emilio Aguinaldo Highway, the main highway of Cavite traversing the city from north to south, the 200-hectare informal industrial estate houses manufacturing companies owned by foreign and Filipino investors. Imus has ventured to the export of automotive wire harness and electrical components, acrylic sheets and lighting fixtures, processed foods, shellcraft, bamboo, rattan and woodcraft, furniture, garments and novelty items to other countries. Several subdivisions and mass housing projects and the establishment of factories and small-scale industries in many of its barangays have resulted in a movement of population into the city.

However, heavy traffic congestion caused by the 'buhos' (pour) system, inadequate road signage and systems, poor road maintenance, mixed vehicles (tricycles, pedicabs, bicycles, etc.), unjustified traffic priority schemes and rampant violation of traffic rules is observable on roads. This is causing headaches to travelers specifically along Aguinaldo Highway. In an attempt to improve road conditions, traffic lights were installed in Aguinaldo highway and on other busy intersections in the city in 2015.

Ayala Land Inc. is investing Php 70 B for an estate "Vermosa", it will be accessible by Muntinlupa-Cavite Expressway.

Agriculture, particularly rice production, is still practiced in the city.

Government

Elected officials

List of heads

Gobernadorcillos
Licerio Topacio (1888–1890)
Cayetano Topacio (1890–1892)
Angel Buenaventura (1892–1894)

Capitanes Municipal
Bernardino Paredes (1894–1896)
Jose Tagle (1896–1897)
Valentin Conejo (1898–1900)

Municipal presidents
Donato Virata (1900–1903)
Juan Viña (1903)
Licerio Topacio (1903)
Pedro Buenaventura (1903)
Pantaleon Garcia (1904–1905)
Felipe Viña (1905–1909)
Maximo Abad (1910–1912)
Felipe Viña (1912–1915)
Pablo Palma (acting: 1912–1913)
Cecilio Kamantigue (1915–1919)
Felix Paredes (1919–1925)
Blas Mallari (1925–1928)
Epifanio Gabriel (1928–1931)

Mayors

City seal

Inscriptions.  The official seal of the City of Imus bears the inscriptions Lungsod ng Imus, Lalawigan ng Cavite (City of Imus, Province of Cavite), the year 2012 representing the year of the city charter.
Symbolism.  The nine sun's rays symbolizes hope and bright future.  The gear symbolizes trade and industry.  The church signifies the separation of church and state, and the rich cultural traditions. The Imus City Hall building signifies heritage, peaceful and good living conditions and citizenry participation. The school and houses signifies community development and Christian endeavors.  The satellite symbolizes technology. The road signifies the development of the city towards industrialization.  The lady signifies Inang Bayan (Motherland) representing Filipino nationalism in the Battle of Alapan.  The jeepney represents the entrepreneurial spirit of the Imuseños.
Colors.  Yellow represent the spirited, joyful and bright outlook of the people; blue denotes peace and order maintained through the unparalleled support of its citizenry; and green for growth and prosperity leading to the flfillment of its people's dream and aspirations.

Notable personalities
Ayong Maliksi, former PCSO chairman, former representative 3rd District, Cavite, former mayor of Imus, former Cavite governor 
Cesar E.A. Virata, former Prime Minister of the Philippines
Chlaui Malayao, Filipina child actress from GMA Network.
Christian Bautista, singer, actor
Gilbert Remulla, news anchor, TV host, former representative 2nd District, Cavite
Juanito Victor C. Remulla, politician, Cavite Governor and former vice-governor
Kaye Abad, actress
Leonardo Sarao, businessman and jeepney designer, founder of Sarao Motors
Luis Antonio Cardinal Tagle DD, SThD.,  Bishop Emeritus of the Diocese of Imus, Archbishop Emeritus of the Archdiocese of Manila, Filipino Cardinal, President, Caritas Internationalis, and Prefect of the Congregation for the Evangelization of Peoples
Marcelito Pomoy, singer, Pilipinas Got Talent Season 2 Grand Winner
Panfilo Lacson, senator, former Philippine National Police chief
Terrence Romeo, professional basketball player for San Miguel Beermen
Jose R. Velasco, National Scientist, chemist and agriculturist
Hilario Lara, National Scientist of the Philippines for Public Health 
Leonides Sarao Virata, Economist
Helena Zoila Tirona Benitez, former Senator, educator
Francisca Tirona, educator, co-founder of the Philippine Women's University
Hilaria del Rosario de Aguinaldo, first wife of Gen. Emilio Aguinaldo

Gallery

References

External links 

 
 [ Philippine Standard Geographic Code]
 Philippine Census Information

 
Cities in Cavite
Populated places established in 1795
Provincial capitals of the Philippines
1795 establishments in the Philippines
Component cities in the Philippines